Alias Maria is a 2015 Colombian drama film directed by José Luis Rugeles Gracia. It was screened in the Un Certain Regard section at the 2015 Cannes Film Festival. It received the Golden Goats Award for the Best Feature Movie for the Young People at the 2016 Ale Kino! Festival. It was also selected as the Colombian entry for the Best Foreign Language Film at the 89th Academy Awards but was not nominated.

The 13 year old Maria is a member of a guerrilla unit in Colombia. She is sent for a special mission together with three others to bring the commander's child into safety. Meanwhile, she is pregnant herself.

Cast
 Carlos Clavijo as Mauricio
 Anderson Gomez as Byron
 Carmenza González as Doctor's Wife
 Lola Lagos as Diana
 Julio Pachón as Doctor
 Erik Ruiz as Yuldor
 Karen Torres as Maria
 Fabio Velazco as The Commander

See also
 List of submissions to the 89th Academy Awards for Best Foreign Language Film
 List of Colombian submissions for the Academy Award for Best Foreign Language Film

References

External links
 

2015 films
2015 drama films
Colombian drama films
2010s Spanish-language films
2010s Colombian films